The TECO Line Streetcar  is a heritage streetcar transit line in Tampa, Florida, run by the Hillsborough Area Regional Transportation Authority (HART), owned by the city of Tampa, and managed by Tampa Historic Streetcar, Inc. It connects Downtown and Channelside to the historic Ybor City district. There is also an "In-Town" trolley-replica bus system that connects Downtown, Channelside, and Harbour Island.

The system is single-track with several passing sidings, which mostly follows a reserved right-of-way at a cost of 13.7 million per mile. Ten replica historic streetcars and one restored historic streetcar are used on the line. The replica cars themselves cost $745,000 each. A $2.7 million grant from the Florida Department of Transportation awarded in 2018 allowed HART to eliminate fares and increase frequency on the line, causing a significant increase in ridership. 

A county tax to help pay for the development was ruled unconstitutional by the Supreme Court of Florida in 2021 after being passed locally.

First streetcars in Tampa

The first streetcars in Tampa were operated by the Tampa Street Railway Company between downtown Tampa and Ybor City. The line started operation in 1885, using wood-burning steam engines. In 1892 the Tampa Street Railway Company merged with the Florida Electric Company to form the Tampa Street Railway and Power Company, and converted to electrically powered streetcars in 1893. Also in 1892, a rival company, the Tampa Suburban Company, was organized to compete with the Tampa Street Railway Company, but was blocked from operating by an injunction. A new company, The Consumers Electric Light and Street Railway Company was formed, and soon out-competed the Tampa Railway Company by lowering its fares. The Consumers Electric Light and Street Railway Company bought out the Tampa Street Railway Company in 1894. The company also acquired control of the Tampa and Palmetto Beach Rail Company, becoming the sole streetcar operator in Tampa. The Tampa Electric Company acquired control of the Consumers Electric Light and Street Railway Company in 1899.

The Tampa Electric Company acquired  of streetcar track with the Consumers Electric Light and Street Railway Company in 1899. That year the Tampa Electric system carried almost 24 million passengers. The streetcar system in Tampa was shut down after World War Two, with the last cars removed from service some time between 1946 and 1949.

Revival

Its operating costs are financed through a special tax assessment (.33 per thousand) on businesses in the streetcar district and a streetcar endowment stemming from settlement money received in 2006 by the city for the demolition of the Harbour Island People Mover.

In its first year of operation, the streetcar carried 420,000 riders, 20% more than projected. In 2005, 434,498 passengers used the streetcar. In 2011, streetcar ridership from October 2011 through May decreased by 8.3 percent to 265,148 with a total for the year of 358,737 riders. In 2015, the streetcar served 285,900 passengers.

A new  extension, costing $5.5 million, opened for revenue service on December 19, 2010. The extension runs north along Franklin Street to Whiting Street and the Fort Brooke parking garage, connecting the Convention Center as well as the rest of the TECO Line to the downtown core.

Station list
From north to south, the stations are
; the northern terminus of the line
; formerly Tampa Bay Federal Credit Union

; formerly The Tampa Tribune station

Dick Greco Plaza; former southern terminus until 2010, connection to Purple Line; signed as TRANSPORTATION PLAZA on rollsigns
; southern terminus, connection to HART bus routes 1 and 30, access to Fort Brooke parking garage.

Rolling stock

The system originally had had eleven operating streetcars: nine modern replica double-truck Birney cars, one replica open-bench "Breezer" (similar to J.G. Brill cars built for Metropolitan Street Railway of New York), and one restored original Birney car.  The replicas were built by the Gomaco Trolley Company in Ida Grove, Iowa. In 2020, the number of operating streetcars was reduced to ten as car #429 was in an accident that damaged it beyond repair. The replica vehicles resemble the originals that were operating in the city from the 1920s to 1946. 

The Birney #163, is the fully restored unit and is smaller than the replica models. This streetcar ran on the Tampa & Ybor City Street Railway between 1923 and 1946.  It was found in 1991 in Sulphur Springs, a neighborhood in Tampa, where it had been used as an apartment and later a storage shed. Volunteers worked more than 10,000 hours to restore the car to its former condition. It is Florida's only operational historic streetcar.

The replica Birney cars have a welded steel body with cosmetic rivets added to make them look older. The cars are wheelchair-accessible, air-conditioned and have automated stop announcements. The seats are made of wood and are reversible for when the car changes direction. The cars are also equipped with on-board ticket dispensers; however, they do not provide change.

Financing

The agency that operates the streetcar is a non-profit. On October 22, 2014, the Tampa Bay Times published an editorial on the leverage a subsidy the Tampa Port Authority gives to the streetcar system.  However it also wrote that the system "is not dependent" on the subsidy.  They also reported that the system has to pay almost half a million dollars in insurance to cover the risk of streetcars crossing an active freight rail line.

The single-ride adult fare was $2.50 prior to October 2018. Starting that month, fares were dropped for a three year period due to a grant from the Florida Department of Transportation. As a result, ridership on the 2.7 mile line has skyrocketed, with almost three times as many riders in 2019 as in 2018.

Plenary Americas US Holdings Inc has proposed partnering with the city to build a transit line primarily along Cypress Street - connecting Ybor City, Channelside, Downtown, Midtown, Westshore, and the airport. The new line may be called the CrossTampa Transit Connector with 16 stations and two major multipurpose hubs.

The Florida Department of Revenue awarded $67 million for the streetcar expansion on December 8, 2020. The city hoped the updated and extended streetcar service would be up and running by the end of 2026.

In February 2021 the Florida Supreme Court declared a one-percent county-wide sales tax unconstitutional in a 4-1 vote. The "All for Transportation" sales tax was approved by Hillsborough County voters in 2018 and $400 million had already been collected but was left unspent. The funds from this tax were the primary local funding source for the extension project, and thus the future of the project has been placed under review. A new measure to replace the 2018 tax was proposed in 2022. The referendum for a one percent sales tax was rejected by 2022 voters with results of 48.60% For vs. 51.40% Against.

Gallery

See also

Light rail in the United States
List of heritage railroads in the United States
List of streetcar systems in the United States
Royal Palm Railway Experience
Streetcars in North America
Transportation in Florida

References

External links

TECO Line official site
North American Vintage Trolley Systems
TECO Streetcar at Tampa Rail Website

2002 establishments in Florida
Heritage streetcar systems
Hillsborough Area Regional Transit
Streetcars in Florida
Railway lines opened in 2002
Transportation in Tampa, Florida